Dan Yaccarino (born May 20, 1965, age 56) is an American author, illustrator, and television producer, who is famous for his animated series, children's books and award-winning imagery.

Biography
Born in Montclair, NJ, Yaccarino was influenced by a combination of advertising, comic books, vintage animation, toys, and old films, spending his childhood immersed in drawing, writing, and making movies.

Yaccarino attended Otis College of Art and Design in Los Angeles, CA, as well as Parson School of Design in NYC, where he earned a BFA in illustration in 1987.

"I'm inspired by other children’s book authors and illustrators," Yaccarino was quoted in saying, "as well as people from other fields like the director Henry Selick and singer-songwriter Brian Wilson."

Very soon after graduation, he began a commercial illustration career, starting with the New York Times Book Review, quickly moving on to national newspapers and magazines, as well as advertising campaigns.

Children's literature
Yaccarino wrote and illustrated his first picture book Big Brother Mike in 1993 and has created dozens of books for children since, most notably Every Friday, The Fantastic Undersea Life of Jacques Cousteau, Unlovable and the autobiographical, All the Way To America: The Story of A Big Italian Family and A Little Shovel. He has also illustrated stories written by some of the most prestigious names in children's literature, including  Margaret Wise Brown, Jack Prelutsky, and Kevin Henkes. Yaccarino's work in children's literature has garnered many glowing reviews and a worldwide following. He has been invited to the White House to share his books and participate in the annual Easter festivities. He has also presented his work at Pixar studio and has keynoted several children's literature conferences.

Series
He is the creator and executive producer of Apple TV's Doug Unplugs, the Nick Jr. series Oswald, and Willa's Wild Life (with Canada-based Nelvana), as well as the character designer behind Nick Jr.'s The Backyardigans. 

Animation Magazine hails him as "an American original".

Illustration
Yaccarino's illustrations have adorned the pages of such publications as The New York Times, Rolling Stone,
Travel & Leisure, Business Week, Network World, Psychology Today, and New York Magazine. He has created images for a wide variety of corporate projects and advertising campaigns as well, including Cotton Inc, AT&T and Gardenburger. His work is widely received in Japan, and he has worked extensively for clients such as Sony and Nikkei.

Partial bibliography
Big Brother Mike
Bam Bam Bam
One Hole in the Road
If I Had a Robot
Zoom Zoom Zoom! I’m Off to the Moon!
Good Night, Mr. Night
An Octopus Followed Me Home
Five Little Pumpkins
Little White Dog
Circle Dogs
Trashy Town
Deep in the Jungle
Blast Off Boy and Blorp: First Day on a Strange New Planet
Blast Off Boy and Blorp: New Pet
Blast Off Boy and Blorp: The Big Science Fair
Come With Me
Surviving Brick Johnson
Oswald
Unlovable
The Good Little Bad Little Pig
The Lima Bean Monster
Dan Yaccarino’s Mother Goose
Where the Four Winds Blow
Bittle
The Birthday Fish
Every Friday
Who Will Sing a Lullaby?
Go Go America
Little Boy With a Big Horn
The Fantastic Undersea Life of Jacques Cousteau
Lawn to Lawn
Cooking With Henry and Ellibelly
All the Way To America: The Story of A Big Italian Family and A Little Shovel
The Belly Book
Boy & Bot
Kate and Nate Are Running Late
Doug Unplugged
Zorgoochi Intergalactic Pizza
Billy & Goat at the State Fair
The Happyland series
Class Pet Squad: Journey to the Center of Town
I am a Story
Morris Mole
Giant Tess
Smashy Town
The Longest Storm
City Under the City

References

External links
 Official Website
 7 Impossible Things Before Breakfast Interview with Dan Yaccarino: http://blaine.org/sevenimpossiblethings/?p=1628
 Dan Yaccarino on IMDB

American children's writers
Parsons School of Design alumni
Living people
1965 births
People from Montclair, New Jersey